The South African Business Schools Association (SABSA) is an association of South African business schools offering accredited MBA programmes. Institutions are accredited in South Africa by the Council on Higher Education (CHE), whilst institutions also pursue international accreditation from AMBA, EQUIS and AACSB.

Members

† Note as of January 2008 GIBS replaced the Graduate School of Management, which was founded in 1949 and was the first MBA programme to be launched outside of North America.

Partners
SABSA partners with the Association of African Business Schools (AABS) and SADCnet (funded by the W. K. Kellogg Foundation, Gordon Institute of Business Science and the University of Botswana. SADCnet offers workshops for business schools leaders in the Southern African Development Community (SADC).

References

Business schools in South Africa